Makenzie Fischer (born March 29, 1997) is an American water polo player. She was part of the gold medal-winning American team at the 2015 World Aquatics Championships, where she played in the centre back position. She was also part of the gold medal-winning American team at the 2016 Summer Olympics.

Personal life
Fischer's younger sister, Aria Fischer, is also on the American Women's National Team for Water Polo.  Their father, Erich Fischer, competed on the American men's national team for water polo.  Her uncle, Martin Fischer, was a goalkeeper for Stanford's men's water polo team. and would later coach Stanford's women's team to their first ever national title.

Fischer graduated from Laguna Beach High School in 2015 and is currently majoring in Mechanical Engineering at Stanford University.

See also
 United States women's Olympic water polo team records and statistics
 List of Olympic champions in women's water polo
 List of Olympic medalists in water polo (women)
 List of world champions in women's water polo
 List of World Aquatics Championships medalists in water polo

References

External links
 
 

1997 births
Living people
People from Laguna Beach, California
American female water polo players
Water polo centre backs
Water polo players at the 2016 Summer Olympics
Medalists at the 2016 Summer Olympics
Olympic gold medalists for the United States in water polo
World Aquatics Championships medalists in water polo
Water polo players at the 2015 Pan American Games
Water polo players at the 2019 Pan American Games
Pan American Games medalists in water polo
Pan American Games gold medalists for the United States
Medalists at the 2015 Pan American Games
Medalists at the 2019 Pan American Games
Water polo players at the 2020 Summer Olympics
Stanford Cardinal women's water polo players
Medalists at the 2020 Summer Olympics